Panos Aravantinos (Corfu, 1886 – Paris, 4 December 1930) was a Greek and German opera scenery and costume designer and decorator.

Life

Aravantinos was born on the island of Corfu, and was educated in both Athens and Germany. He returned to Greece to fight in the Balkan Wars. It was at this time he designed a collection of uniforms for the Greek army. In 1914, he made his debut at the Royal Theatre of Athens. He won international recognition in 1920 with his set designs for the Berlin State Opera's staging of Strauss' opera Die Frau ohne Schatten.

His career in Germany reached its peak in 1926, when he was appointed as the artistic counselor for a number of Berlin theatres.

During his career, he used Constructivism, expressionism, Russian avant-garde and symbolism, as well as ancient Greek art as stylistic influences.

He died in Paris at the age of 46 from pneumonia.

1300 pieces from his collection were donated by him to the Piraeus municipality, and now reside at the Panos Aravantinos Decor Museum.

Gallery

References

1886 births
1930 deaths
Artists from Corfu
Greek scenic designers
German scenic designers
Greek costume designers
Greek emigrants to Germany